The Syro-Malankara Catholic Church, also known as the Malankara Syrian Catholic Church, is an Eastern Catholic sui iuris particular church in full communion with the worldwide Catholic Church possessing self-governance under the Code of Canons of the Eastern Churches. It is one of the major archiepiscopal churches of the Catholic Church. It is headed by Major Archbishop Baselios Cardinal Cleemis Catholicos of the Major Archdiocese of Trivandrum based in Kerala, India.

The Malankara Syrian Catholic Church traces its origins to the missions of Thomas the Apostle in the 1st century. The Church employs the West Syriac Rite Divine Liturgy of Saint James. It is one of the two Eastern Catholic churches in India, the other being the Syro-Malabar Church which employs the East Syriac Rite liturgy.

The Malankara Syrian Catholic Church was formed on 20 September 1930 as a result of the reunion movement under the leadership of Archbishop Geevarghese Ivanios, when it split from the Malankara Orthodox Syrian Church and entered into communion with the Catholic Church. The Malankara Church itself had emerged from the split within the Saint Thomas Christian community of the 17th century; after the Coonan Cross Oath in 1653, the Malankara Church emerged as the faction that stood with Archdeacon Thoma I in swearing to resist the authority of the Latin Catholic Portuguese Padroado. This faction entered into a relationship with the Syriac Orthodox Church of Antioch and adopted the West Syriac Rite (the Saint Thomas Christians of India had until this point used the East Syriac Rite inherited from the historic Church of the East). The Syro-Malankara Catholic Church represents the group from this Malankara faction that reunited with Rome in the 20th century (1930).

Mar Ivanios started to have negotiations with the Holy See of Rome in 1926 to enter into a new communion. The two bishops including Ivanios, a priest, a deacon and a layman were received into the Catholic Church together on 1930. By 1950 there were some 65,588 faithful, in 1960 112,478, and in 1970 183,490. There are now over 400,000 faithful in over 12 dioceses in India and across the world.

History

Saint Thomas Christians

Coonan Cross Oath
A protest took place in 1653 with the Coonan Cross Oath (Oath of the bent cross). Under the leadership of Archdeacon Thomas, the Thomas Christians publicly took an oath that they would not obey the Jesuit Bishops. Church historian KOOTHUR observes that "the 'Coonan Cross' revolution obviously was the final outbreak of the storm that had been gathering on the horizon of the ecclesial life of the St. Thomas Christians for over a century."

Rome sent Carmelites in two groups from the Propagation of the Faith to Malabar headed by Fr. Sebastiani and Fr. Hyacinth. Fr. Sebastiani arrived first in 1655 and began to speak directly with the archdeacon, Thoma I. Fr. Sebastiani, with the help of Portuguese, gained the support of many, especially with the support of Palliveettil Chandy, Kadavil Chandy Kathanar and Vengoor Geevarghese Kathanar. These were the three of the four counselors of Thoma I, who along with Thoma I,  had defected with Francisco Garcia Mendes, Archbishop of Cranganore, before the arrival of Sebastaini, according to Jesuit reports.

Between 1661 and 1662, out of the 116 churches, the Carmelites claimed eighty-four churches, leaving the native Thoma I with thirty-two churches. The eighty-four churches and their congregations were the body from which the Syro Malabar Church and Chaldean Syrian Church have descended. The other thirty-two churches and their congregations represented the nucleus from which the Malankara Syriac Orthodox Church (Jacobite Church),  Malankara Orthodox Syrian Church (Indian Orthodox), the Malabar Independent Syrian Church (Thozhiyur Church), Malankara Mar Thoma Syrian Church (Reformed Syrians), and Syro-Malankara Catholic Church have originated.

In 1665 Gregorios, a bishop sent by the Syriac Orthodox Patriarch of Antioch, arrived in India. The independent group under the leadership of the archdeacon welcomed him. Though most of the St. Thomas Christians gradually relented in their strong opposition to the Western control, the arrival of Bishop Gregorios of the Syriac Orthodox Church in 1665 marked the beginning of a formal schism among the St. Thomas Christians. Those who accepted the West Syriac liturgical tradition of the Syriac Orthodox Church of Antioch of Gregorios became known as the Puthenkoor. Those who were in the communion of Rome after the Synod of Daimper and remained in the communion even after the oath of bent cross, and those who rejoined the Catholic communion from the Puthenkoor church during the Carmelite period, came to be known as the Pazhayakoor. 

Both factions continued to use the name "Malankara", the real name of the St. Thomas Christian community for the church. Some of the Pazhayakoor churches not joined in the Angamaly Padiyola (1787) later became Latin churches, e.g. Mathilakom (Pappinivattom), Maliankara, Thuruthipuram, etc. One branch of the Pazhayakoor Church later re-established ties with the Assyrian Church of the East and formed the Chaldean Syrian Church when an East Syriac bishop, Gabriel, came to evangelize them in 1701. Kottayam Cheriapally was the headquarters of Gabriel.

The remaining Pazhayakoor christians came to be known as the Syro Malabar Church from the last decade of the Nineteenth century onwards.

Turbulence in Malankara Church

It was in this contentious context that the 118th Syriac Orthodox Patriarch of Antioch, Ignatius Abded Aloho II, went to Malankara in 1911 and excommunicated Vattasseril Geevarghese Dionysius (This excommunication was declared invalid by the High Court of Travancore). To ward off the undue interference of the Patriarch in the administration of the temporalities of the Church, Fr. P.T. Geevarghese with the blessing of Vattasseril Thirumeni contacted Ignatius Abdul Masih II, the 117th Syriac Orthodox Patriarch of Antioch, who had been excommunicated by the Ottoman government in 1906, and invited him to visit Malankara and to establish a Catholicate here. Accordingly, Ignatius Abdul Masih II went to Malankara in 1912 and established the Catholicate in Malankara. This created a split in the church:
the faction resisting the Patriarch's administrative interference became the Malankara Orthodox Syrian Church, an autocephalous Church under Malankara Metropolitan and the Catholicos;
the faction supporting the Patriarch's administration became the Malankara Syriac Orthodox Church (known today as the Jacobite Syrian Christian Church).

Baselios Paulose I (1912–1913), the first Catholicos, died after a short period of five months on 13 May 1913; the See remained vacant until 1925. That was a period of litigation in the Malankara Church. The litigation for Vattippanam (a fixed deposit of money in the name of the Church) and its after-effects in the community was at its zenith.

Geevarghese Ivanios

Geevarghese was born on 21st Sept 1882 at Mavelikara to the 'Mallitty' Panickervettil family, belonging to the Malankara Orthodox Syrian Church. He was given the baptismal name Geevarghese. At the age of 15 he joined M. D. Seminary School for high school studies. On 20 April 20, 1898 he received minor orders and was sent to Madras Christian College and obtained his master's degree. On 15 September 1908 Geevarghese was ordained priest by Vattasseril Dinoysius. Just after the ordination Geevarghese was appointed Principal of M. D. Seminary, Kottayam. Later he moved to Calcutta, accepting an invitation to teach at Searmpore College. During his stay at Calcutta Geevarghese founded a monastic community.

Establishment of Bethany Ashram

On Geevarghese's return from Calcutta a friend, E. John Vakeel, donated  of land at Mundanmala, Ranni-Perunadu, Kerala, at the meeting place of the rivers Pampa and Kakkatt for an ashram. Geevarghese and his followers built a small thatched hut at what became the first Ashram in Malankara on 15 August 1919, named "Bethany". Along with the Ashram, Geevarghese started a house for orphans.

While at Serampore, Geevarghese founded the Bethany Madhom (convent) for women religious in 1925, with the help of the Epiphany Sisters of England working at Serampore. He was ordained a bishop of the Malankara Orthodox Syrian Church by Catholicos Beselios Geevarghese I on 1 May 1925. He received the name Geevarghese Ivanios.

Ecclesial communion

On 20 September 1930 Ivanios, Bishop Jacob Theophilos, Fr. John Kuzhinapurath OIC, Dn. Alexander OIC, and Chacko Kilileth embraced and united with the Catholic Church. The Union Movement under the leadership of Ivanios gave rise to Malankara Catholic Church. This took place in the Quilon bishop’s chapel. The members of the Jacobite Church were received by his Lordship Bishop Aloysius Maria Benziger (Bishop of Quilon), whom Ivanios approached for help and who was deputed by the Holy See to perform the reception.

After Reunion movement
Pope Pius XI, through the Apostolic Constitution Christo Pastorum Principi of 11 June 1932, established the Syro-Malankara Catholic hierarchy for the reunited community and erected the Archeparchy of Thiruvananthapuram with the Eparchy of Tiruvalla as its suffragan. The Metropolitan Eparchy of Thiruvananthapuram was established in 1933. Ivanios was enthroned as its first Metropolitan Archbishop. The Eparchy of Tiruvalla was established in 1933. Jacob Theophilos was enthroned as its first bishop.

In 1937 Joseph Severios of the Malankara Orthodox Church joined the Catholic Church. In 1939, Thomas Dioscoros, the metropolitan of the Knanaya Jacobite Church, joined the Catholic Church. In 1938, the missionary congregation of the Daughters of Mary was founded at Marthandom in Kanyakumari District. Bishop Dioscoros died in 1943.

Ivanios consecrated Benedict Gregorios as his auxiliary bishop in 1953. Ivanios died on 15 July 1953.

The Eparchy of Tiruvalla was led by Jacob Theophilos and Joseph Severios.  Severios was the administrator of the eparchy until 1950 due to the ill health of Theophilos. In 1950 he was appointed as the bishop of Tiruvalla. He was also invested with the title archbishop. He died on 18 January 1955.

Metropolitan Archbishop Benedict Gregorios

In 1955 Metropolitan Archbishop Benedict Gregorios was enthroned as the metropolitan archbishop of Thiruvananthapuram and the head of the Syro-Malankara Catholic Church.

The Holy See appointed Zacharias Athanasios as successor to Severios; his consecration took place in 1954. Jacob Theophilos died in 1956.

Francis Acharya, a Cistercian monk, came to the Eparchy of Tiruvalla. In the year 1957 he founded the Kristiya Sanyasa Samaj, Kurisumala Ashram in the high ranges of Vagamon.

In 1958 the territorial boundary of the Eparchy of Tiruvalla was extended north to include the Malabar region of Kerala, the civil districts of Coimbatore and Nilgiris and Karoor Taluk in Tiruchirappally District of Tamil Nadu and districts of Mysore, Mandya, Coorg, Hasan, Chickamangalore, Shimoga and South Kanara of Karnataka State.

Athanasios died in 1977.

Paulos Philoxenos, the metropolitan of the Malabar Independent Syrian Church, was received into the Syro-Malankara Catholic Church on 28 August 1977.

The appointment of Isaac Yoohanon as Bishop of Tiruvalla and erection of the Eparchy of Bathery with the appointment of Cyril Baselios as its first bishop through the decree of the Holy See took place in 1978. Both prelates were consecrated that year.

The Eparchy of Bathery was officially inaugurated in 1978. In 1979 the Eparchial contemplative monastery, Dhyana Ashram, was founded in the Eparchy of Bathery by Fr. Silvester Kozhimannil.

Lawrence Ephrem was consecrated bishop in 1980.

Malankara Catholics within India but outside the canonical territorial boundaries of the Church were first organized as Malankara Catholic Associations, and later came to be erected as personal parish communities. A coordinator was appointed to oversee them, in the Council of Hierarchs of the Malankara Catholic Church.

St. Mary’s Malankara Major Seminary, the first local seminary, was inaugurated at Pattom in 1983 and the new building was blessed at Nalanchira, Thiruvananthapuram was blessed in 1989.

On 8 February 1986, Pope John Paul II visited St. Mary's Cathedral, Pattom, Thiruvananthapuram.

On 28 April 1987, Yoohanon, the bishop of Tiruvalla died.

Cardinal Lourdusamy, the then prefect of the Congregation for the Oriental Churches, visited the Malankara Catholic Church in August 1987.

Geevarghese Timotheos succeeded Yoohanon as the bishop of Tiruvalla. He was consecrated bishop in 1988.

Benedict Gregorios died in 1994 after serving 41 years.

Moran Mor Cyril Baselios, Major Archbishop - Catholicos

Cyril Baselios, the bishop of Bathery having been appointed by Pope John Paul II, was enthroned as Metropolitan Archbishop of Thiruvananthapuram and as the head of the Malankara Catholic Church on 14 December 1995. Geevarghese Divannasios was consecrated Bishop of Bathery in the place of Cyril Baselios on 5 February 1997.
Achille Silvestrini, Cardinal Prefect of the Congregation for the Oriental Churches, visited the Malankara Catholic Church on 11–13 February 1996.

On the request of Cyril Baselios, by an Apostolic Bull dated 16 December 1996, Pope John Paul II erected the Eparchy of Marthandom bifurcating the Metropolitan Eparchy of Thiruvananthapuram. Lawrence Ephrem was appointed as its first bishop. He died after a few months of his enthronement as Bishop of Marthandom, on 8 April 1997.

In the meantime the Eparchy of Tiruvalla was blessed with an auxiliary bishop in the person of Thomas Koorilos, who was consecrated bishop on 17 July 1997. On 29 June 1998 Yoohanon Chrysostom was consecrated as the bishop of Marthandom and Joshua Ignathios as the auxiliary bishop for the Metropolitan Eparchy of Thiruvananthapuram. Paulos Philoxenos died on 3 November 1998.

Christu Jayanthi Maha Jubilee and the Sapthathy of the Re-union Movement of the Syro-Malankara Catholic Church were celebrated jointly at Tiruvalla on 26–28 December 2000.

In this period parishes for the faithful of the Syro-Malankara Catholic Church in the United States of America were established. On 18 June 2001 Pope John Paul II nominated the Proto-Syncellus of Bathery Isaac Thottunkal, auxiliary bishop of Thiruvananthapuram and apostolic visitor for the Syro-Malankarites residing in North America and Europe. He was consecrated on 15 August 2001 at Tirumoolapuram, (Tiruvalla), and assumed the name Isaac Cleemis.

Bifurcating the Eparchy of Tiruvalla, the Eparchy of Muvattupuzha was erected on 15 January 2003 and Thomas Koorilos was appointed as its first bishop.

On 29 March 2003 Bishop Timotheos resigned due to his age, and the Holy See appointed Isaac Cleemis, the apostolic visitor to Europe and America, as the bishop of Tiruvalla. Cleemis took charge of the diocese on 2 October 2003. On 5 January 2005 Joseph Thomas was appointed as the auxiliary bishop of Thiruvananthapuram and apostolic visitor to North America and Europe.

On 10 February 2005, the Syro-Malankara Catholic Church was raised to the status of a major archiepiscopal Church by the papal document Ab ipso Sancto Thoma, and as such possesses a high level of autonomy under the Code of Canons of the Eastern Churches. Pedro López Quintana, the Apostolic Nuncio in India, read the official declaration at St. Mary's Cathedral, Pattom, Thiruvananthapuram. The Hierarchical Head of the Church became a Major Archbishop who exercises patriarchal powers and governs the Church assisted by the Holy Synod of Bishops of the Church.

On 19 February 2005, Joseph Thomas was consecrated as auxiliary bishop of Thiruvananthapuram and apostolic visitor to North America and Europe. On 11 April 2005 the Faculty of Theology of St. Mary’s Malankara Major Seminary became affiliated to the Pontifical Urban University, Rome.

The enthronement of the major archbishop as the head of the Syro-Malankara Catholic Church took place on 14 May 2005.  The Malankara Major Archiepiscopal Curia (Catholicate Centre) started functioning at the St. Mary's Campus, Pattom, Thiruvananthapuram. On 20 May 2005, Cyril Baselios blessed the Curia building. Baselios soon constituted the first synod of the Syro-Malankara Catholic Church, convened from 16 to 18 August 2005 at the Major Archiepiscopal Curia, Thiruvananthapuram. It constituted the Permanent Synod and the various Synodal Commissions headed by bishops to take care of various apostolates of the Church. The official bulletin, Malankara is published from the Major Archiepiscopal Curia, to communicate the Synodal acts and voice of the Syro-Malankara Major Archiepiscopal Church.

The platinum jubilee of the Reunion Movement and the Year of the Eucharist were celebrated jointly at Mar Ivanios Nagar, Punnamoodu, Mavelikara, on 19–21 September 2005.

By decrees of Baselios, the Metropolitan Province of Tiruvalla, with the Eparchies of Bathery and Muvattupuzha as suffragans, was established on 15 May 2006 and Isaac Cleemis was appointed as the metropolitan archbishop of Tiruvalla. On 10 June 2006 Isaac Cleemis was enthroned as the first metropolitan-archbishop of Tiruvalla.

By the decree of Baselios, on 1 January 2007, the new Eparchy of Mavelikara was erected and Joshua Ignathios, the auxiliary bishop and protosyncellus of the Major Archdiocese of Thiruvananthapuram, was appointed as its first bishop.

The Second Ordinary Holy Episcopal Synod was convoked on 6–7 December 2006 and it was decided to revive monastic consecration according to the tradition of the Antiochene Church, properly termed Rabban per the Syriac, but locally called Ramban; and Corepiscopo, to honour a number of priests for their meritorious service in the Church.

On Thursday, 18 January 2007, Cyril Baselios died, and was entombed by the side of his predecessors at St. Mary's Cathedral, Pattom, Thiruvananthapuram on 20 January 2007.

Moran Mor Baselios Cleemis, Major Archbishop - Catholicos and Cardinal
Isaac Cleemis was elected the Major Archbishop of the Syro-Malankara Catholic Church through the first Episcopal Synod of election of the Syro-Malankara Catholic Church held on 7–10 February 2007 at the Catholicate Centre, Pattom, Thiruvananthapuram. Pope Benedict XVI confirmed the election on 9 February and it was announced on 10 February at St. Mary's Cathedral, Pattom, Thiruvananthapuram.

The installation of Aboon Joshua Ignathios was held on 16 February 2007 at Mavelikara and Aboon Geevarghese Divannasios, the administrator of The Malankara Catholic Major Archiepiscopal Church, presided over the installation ceremony. The new eparchy has a 30,825 Syro-Malankara Catholic faithful of a total population of 2,998,325 inhabitants. Of this 269,849 are Malankara non-Catholics and 598,824 Christians of other denominations.

On 7 February 2007, Pope Benedict XVI appointed Fr. Chacko Aerath OIC as the Apostolic Visitor with Episcopal status for the Malankara Catholic faithful residing in the Extraterritorial Regions of the Church within India.

Baselios Cleemis was enthroned as the Major Archbishop of the Syro-Malankara Catholic Church on 5 March 2007 at St. Mary's Cathedral, Pattom, Thiruvananthapuram.

In March 2007 the Aboon Thomas Koorilos was appointed the Second Metropolitan Archbishop of the Archieparchy of Tiruvalla. His installation Ceremony was held in May 2007 at St. John's Cathedral, Tiruvalla. Cleemis was the main celebrant.

Baselios Cleemis visited Pope Benedict XVI on 28 May 2007 at the Vatican and exchanged ecclesiastical Communion.

In July 2007 Baselios Cleemis declared Ivanios a Servant of God.

In accordance with the provisions of CCEO can. 1063, the Ordinary Tribunal of the Syro-Malankara Catholic Church was constituted on 15 November 2007.

Aboon Abraham Julios, PhD, was consecrated Bishop of the Eparchy of Moovattupuzha by Baselios Cleemis on 9 February 2008 at Moovattupuzha.

Baselios Cleemis blessed the newly built Tomb Chapel of the Servant of God Ivanios in St. Mary's Cathedral, Pattom, Thiruvananthapuram, on 1 July 2008.

Leonardo Sandri, Cardinal Prefect of Congregation for the Oriental Churches, visited the Syro-Malankara Catholic Church on 10 November 2008. Holy Qurbono according to the Syro-Malankara Tradition was celebrated. Baselios Cleemis was the main celebrant. In the following meeting Cardinal Sandri recognized Queen of Peace Pro-Cathedral at Palayam, Thiruvananthapuram, as a Basilica. Cleemis dedicated St. Mary, Queen of Peace Basilica on 7 December 2008.

Cleemis created two new eparchies in the Syro-Malankara Catholic Church, Pathanamthitta in Kerala and Puthur in the State of Karnataka.  He appointed four new bishops, elected by the Holy Episcopal Synod.  He announced the transfer of Bishop of Marthandom Yoohanon Chrysostom to the new See of Pathanamthitta and Bishop Geevarghese Divannasios from the See of Bathery to the new See of Puthur. Joseph Thomas, the Apostolic Visitator to North America and Europe was appointed Bishop of Bathery.  To the See of Marthandom, vacant due to the transfer of its bishop, was appointed Vincent Kulapuravilai, Professor and Registrar of St. Mary's Malankara Seminary Thiruvananthapuram.  Samuel Kattukallil,  Syncellus of the Major Archeparchy of Thiruvananthapuram, and Stephen Thottathil, Dean of the Faculty of Theology of St. Mary's Malankara Seminary, were appointed auxiliary bishops of the Major Archeparchy of Thiruvananthapuram and the Archieparchy of Tiruvalla respectively.  Antony Valiyavilayil, the Postulator of the Cause of Canonisation of Servant of God Archbishop Ivanios and the Chancellor of the Major Archiepiscopal Curia, was appointed the bishop of the Curia.

The episcopal ordination of Bishops Vincent Paulos, Samuel Irenios, Philipose Stephanos and Thomas Anthonios took place at Ivanios Vidya Nagar in Thiruvananthapuram on 13 March 2010

Thomas Naickamparampil was appointed as the first exarch of the Syro-Malankara Catholic Exarchate in the United States by Pope Benedict XVI, with consultation by Cleemis and the Holy Synod of Syro-Malankara Catholic Church, on 14 July 2010. He was ordained bishop and received the name Aboon Thomas Eusebius on 21 September 2010 at St. Mary's Malankara Syrian Catholic Cathedral, Thiruvananthapuram. His installation ceremony was on 3 October 2010 at Kellenberg Memorial High School, Uniondale, New York.

Baselios Cleemis was elevated to the College of Cardinals of the Catholic Church by Pope Benedict XVI at the Papal Basilica of Saint Peter in the Vatican on 24 November 2012. As Cardinal-Priest he was assigned the titular church of San Gregorio VII. He is the first bishop of the Syro-Malankara church and the fifth Keralite to become cardinal.

The Syro-Malankara Catholic Church is fast growing in theological and canonical studies. Many authors have contributed to the development in the field of theology and canon law.

Besides the canonical institutions of the Syro-Malankara Catholic Church, various associations including the Malankara Catholic Youth Movement (MCYM), the Malankara Catholic Association (MCA), and the Legion of Mary, Matruvedi, Pithruvedi, emerged.

The Syro-Malankara Catholic Church engages in humanitarian activities. One example of such services is Thapovanam, Shelter of Hope, Sulthan Bathery, a centre for the rehabilitation of the mentally ill.

Eparchies

Major Archeparchy of Thiruvananthapuram
Eparchy of Marthandom
Eparchy of Mavelikara
Eparchy of Parassala
Eparchy of Pathanamthitta
Eparchy of St. Ephrem of Khadki
Archieparchy of Tiruvalla
Eparchy of Bathery
Eparchy of Muvattupuzha
Eparchy of Puthur
Eparchy of Gurgaon
Eparchy of the United States of America and Canada

Statistics
According to the Pontifical yearbook Annuario Pontificio for 2012, the Syro-Malankara Church had approximately 436,870 members.

Previous metropolitans

Liturgy and worship
The liturgy of the Syro-Malankara Catholic Church is of the Antiochene Rite, West Syriac in character. The liturgy today is celebrated in Malayalam, Syriac, English, Tamil, and Hindi. The church uses one of several Bible translations into Malayalam.

In the Indian diaspora
There are 39 Syro-Malankara communities in North India, including churches at Bangalore, Chennai, Kolkata, Delhi, Mumbai, Pune and Hyderabad.
On 26 March 2015, Cleemis and the Holy Synod in consultation with Pope Francis erected two Eparchies to cover all of India. Bishop Barnabas Jacob was appointed bishop of the Delhi-based Eparchy of St. John Chrysostom of Gurgaon. Bishop Anthonios Thomas heads the Apostolic Exarchate of St. Ephrem of Khadki.

Around the world

North America

In July 2010, Pope Benedict XVI erected an apostolic exarchate for Syro-Malankara Catholics in the United States, and appointed Father Thomas Naickamparampil, then head secretary general of the major archiepiscopate of the Syro-Malankara Church, as first apostolic exarch of the new exarchate. The bishop-elect was ordained to the episcopacy on 21 September 2010 at St. Mary's Malankara Syrian Catholic Cathedral, Pattom, receiving the name "Aboon Thomas Eusebius". The Enthronement Ceremony in the United States was held on 3 October 2010 at Kellenberg High School, Uniondale, New York.

On 4 January 2016, Pope Francis elevated the exarchate to an eparchy, and Canada was added to the territory of the eparchy.

On 5 August 2017, Bishop Philippos Mar Stephanos was appointed as the second bishop of the eparchy, succeeding Thomas Mar Eusebius. Bishop Mar Stephanos was installed as eparch on 28 October 2017.

There are currently 19 parishes and missions within the eparchy. 14 are within the United States and five within Canada.

Europe and Oceania 
On 5 August 2017 Pope Francis appointed Bishop Yoohanon Mar Theodosius as Apostolic Visitor for Syro-Malankara Catholics Europe and Oceania, alongside his primary work as Bishop of the Major Archiepiscopal Curia of the Syro-Malankara Catholic Church.  There are Syro-Malankara parishes and communities in Germany, Ireland, Italy, Switzerland, the United Kingdom, Australia and New Zealand.

Middle East
Thirteen Syro-Malankara communities are present in Bahrain, Kuwait, Oman, Qatar, and the United Arab Emirates.  Because parishes (Qatar has parish) have not yet been organized, as the Syro-Malankara does not have ecclesiastical jurisdiction in the Middle East, the people are under the direct supervision of the Latin Church Apostolic Vicariate of Northern Arabia and Apostolic Vicariate of Southern Arabia.
Malankara Catholics of Abu Dhabi launched one of the early websites for the Syro Malankara Catholic Church before any official sites were existing and the first in the Middle East. Now almost all communities in the Gulf have their own websites.

Recently Rev. Fr. Mathew Kandathil, a Syro Malankara priest serving in UAE, in the Apostolic Vicariate of Southern Arabia, is appointed the Coordinator of the Malankara Catholic Faithful in the Middle East.  He oversees the pastoral engagement of the Syro-Malankara priests and coordinates the pastoral activities of common interest in the Gulf Region, according to Malankara, the official communiqué of the Syro Malankara Catholic Church regarding this new appointment.

Religious institutes

Daughters of Mary 
The Congregation of the Daughters of Mary is a missionary congregation in the Syro-Malankara Catholic Church. With the blessing of Geevarghese Ivanios, Joseph Kuzhinjalil founded the missionary congregation of the Daughters of Mary in 1938 at Marthandom in Kanyakumari District. The primary mission of the congregation is to bring the Good News to the poor and neglected. The congregation was raised to pontifical right status in 1988. It has 6 provinces  serving six eparchies of the Syro-Malankara Catholic Church and 20 other dioceses worldwide.

The congregation was started following the support provided by the Syro-Malabar Catholic Church, who provided their religious women to join the new congregation. Kuzhinjalil originally belonged to the Syro-Malabar church.

Other institutes 
Order of the Imitation of Christ, Bethany Ashram
Order of the Friars Minor Capuchin
Kristiya Sanyasa Samaj, Kurisumala Ashram
Franciscan Missionary Brothers
Malabar Missionary Brothers
Disciples of Divine Saviour
Dhyana Ashram
Chyalpadi Ashram
Santhi Ashram
Sisters of the Imitation of Christ, Bethany Madhom
Holy Spirit Sisters
Congregation of the Sacred Heart
Dina Sevana Sabha
Sisters of the Charity of St. Vincent de Paul
Snehagiri Missionary Sisters
Little Sisters of Jesus
Sisters of John the Baptist
Salesian Sisters
Basilian sisters
Franciscan Missionaries of Mary
Adoration monastery of Mount Thabor
Gathsemene Samarpitha Satsangham
Little Servants of Divine Providence
Sisters of Charity
Fervent Daughters of the Sacred Heart of Jesus

Seminaries
St. Mary’s Malankara Major Seminary, Thiruvananthapuram
Bethany Vedavijnana Peetham, Pune
St. Aloysius Seminary, Thiruvananthapuram
Infant Mary's Minor Seminary, Thiruvalla
St. Thomas Minor Seminary, Gurukulam, Bathery
St. Ephraem's Minor Seminary, Marthandom
Gurusannidhi Minor Seminary, Muvattupuzha
Ivanios Minor Seminary, Mavelikkara
Gregorios Malankara Syrian Catholic Seminary, New York
 St. Thomas Minor Seminary, Pathanamthitta
 Girideepam Minor Seminary, Diocese of St. John Chrysostom, Gurgaon, New Delhi
Nirmal Hriday Minor Seminary, Pune

Colleges
The Malankara Catholic Educational Society manages various ecclesiastical, charitable, and educational institutions. Baselios Cleemis is the president and Samuel Irenios the vice-chairman of Malankara Catholic Educational Society.

Ivanios College, Thiruvananthapuram
St. John's College, Anchal
Theophilos Taining College, Thiruvananthapuram
Mar Gregorios College of Arts and Science, Chennai
Mar Baselios College of Engineering and Technology, Thiruvananthapuram
Mar Baselios Institute of Technology, Anchal
St. Ephrem Ecumenical Research Institute, Kottayam
Pushpagiri Medical College, Thiruvalla
Pushpagiri College of Pharmacy, Thiruvalla
Pushpagiri College of Nursing, Thiruvalla
Pushpagiri College of Dental Sciences, Thiruvalla
Mar Athanasios College for Advanced Studies, Tiruvalla
Mar Severios College of Teacher Education, Chengaroor, Thiruvalla
St. Joseph's College of Information Technology and Management, Thiruvalla
St. John's Parallel College, Thiruvalla
Pazhassi Raja College, Pulpally, Bathery
Mar Baselios College of Education, Bathery
Mar Ivanios College of Education, Kunthoor, Karnataka
Bethany Junior College, Noojibalthila, Bathery
Malankara Catholic College, Mariagiri, Marthandom
Kanyakumari Community College, Mariagiri, Marthandom
Mar Chrysostom College of Education, Kirathur, Marthandom
Mar Ephraem College of Engineering, Marthandom
Bethany College, Nalanchira, Thiruvananthapuram
Bethany Navajeevan College of Education, Vencode, Marthandom
Girideepam Institute of Advanced Learning, Kottayam
Nirmal Bathany Junior College, Kalewadi, Pune
Bethany Navajeevan College of Physiotherapy, Nalanchira, Thiruvananthapuram
Bethany Navajeevan College of Nursing, Borsi, Durg, Bhilai
Jnanodaya Bethany PU Science College, Nellyadi
St.Joseph's College of Nursing, Anchal

Malankara Catholic Youth Movement
Malankara Catholic Youth Movement (MCYM) is the official organization for the youth in Syro-Malankara Catholic Church. The Catholic Youth Movement of Kerala dates back to the second half of the 1960s. Although there were some youth organisations in the parish level at different parts of Kerala, the spread of the organization of the youth movements in the diocese took place rather late.

MCYM Branches

Kerala MCYM

1) Major Archieparchy of Thiruvananthapuram
2) Archieparchy of Thiruvalla
3) Eparchy of Bathery 
4) Eparchy of Marthandom 
5) Eparchy of Muvattupuzha
6) Eparchy of Mavelikkara
7) Eparchy of Pathanamthitta

MCYM Tamil Nadu

1.) Eparchy of Marthanadom

MCYM Karnataka

1.) Eparchy of Puttur

MCYM ETR in India

1) Apostolic Visitation of North India Malankara Syrian Catholic Churches (MCCETR – New Delhi)

1) Eparchy of USA and Canada (Elmont, New York)

 MCYM-NA (Malankara Catholic Youth Movement of North America)Malankara Catholic Association
Founded in 1989, the Malankara Catholic Association is the association of lay faithful of the Church. Baselios Cleemis is the patron; there are now diocesan sections in the Thiruvananthapuram, Thiruvalla, Bathery, Moovattupuzha and Marthandom Dioceses and in North America.

Official name

The official name of the church is Syro-Malankara Catholic Church which is mainly used in the English speaking Western regions. The name of the church as translated from Malayalam/Syriac is Malankara Syrian Catholic Church.

See also

All India Catholic Union
Churches of Kerala
List of Major Archbishops of Trivandrum
Sacred Heart Catholic Church, Mylapra, Pathanamthitta
Saint Thomas Anglicans
St. Mary's Higher Secondary School, Pattom, Thiruvananthapuram

Sources
 Citations 

Additional sources
 The Syro-Malankara Catholic Major Archiepiscopal Church Directory, Thiruvananthapuram, 2006.
 Ronald Roberson, CSP; The Eastern Christian Churches: A Brief Survey'' (6th Edition); Edizioni Orientalia Christiana, Pontifico Instituto Orientale; Rome, Italy; 1999;

External links

Official websites
Major Archdiocese of Trivandrum
Eparchy of Pathanamthitta
St. Mary, Queen of Peace Syro-Malankara Catholic Eparchy in USA and Canada

Other
Article on the Syro-Malankara Catholic Church by Ronald Roberson on the CNEWA website.

 
1930 establishments in British India